The Gârla Boul Bătrân is a right tributary of the river Prut in Romania. It discharges into the Prut near Fălciu.

References

Rivers of Romania
Rivers of Vaslui County
Tributaries of the Prut